World of Beer, branded as WOB, is an American tavern chain with locations in the United States, China, and South Korea. Founded in 2007, the company's headquarters are in Tampa Bay, Florida. WOB locations sell about 300 craft beers, including almost 50 on tap, and serve food.

In 2018, the company hired former Raymond James investment banker Kevin MacCormack as CFO, and Hard Rock International executive James Buell as vice president of marketing.

References

Alcohol distribution retailers
Drinking establishment chains in the United States
Companies based in Tampa, Florida
Restaurants established in 2007
2007 establishments in Florida
American companies established in 2007